John William Sattler (28 July 1942 – 20 March 2023) was a professional and national representative rugby league footballer who played in the 1960s and 1970s. He was a rugged Prop forward who captained his club, South Sydney to four premiership victories from 1967 to 1971 and who played four Tests for Australia – three as national captain. Known as "Satts", he was one of the hardmen of Australian rugby league and was regarded as an aggressive on field player but a softly spoken gentleman off the field - hence his other nickname "Gentleman John".  His son Scott Sattler was also a professional rugby league footballer and won a national premiership with the Penrith Panthers in 2003.

Club career
John Sattler was born in 1942 at Telarah, New South Wales, and moved to Kurri Kurri with his family when he was 12 years old. His paternal grandfather, Peter Sattler, was a German immigrant who arrived in Maitland NSW in the late 1890s aged 6. He attended Marist Brothers High School in Maitland, New South Wales, Sattler began playing rugby league at the late age of 16 for Kurri Kurri and represented Newcastle against the touring British side in 1962. The following year he moved to Sydney and joined the South Sydney Rabbitohs.

In 1967 he was appointed Souths captain and he inspired Souths to premiership wins in the four seasons of 1967, 1968, 1970 and 1971. He also led his team to the Grand Final in 1969 where they lost to Balmain. His could play at lock forward but played his best football and enjoyed his premiership & national representative success as a Prop forward.

After 195 games with South Sydney, and four premiership victories, John Sattler signed for Brisbane Western Suburbs in 1973.

The 1970 Grand Final
In the 1970 grand final, Sattler played with a broken jaw to help Souths to victory over Manly.
In the premiership decider of 1970 South Sydney were up against the Manly-Warringah Sea Eagles at the Sydney Cricket Ground on 19 September. Having lost the previous Grand Final to the Balmain Tigers, Souths were desperate to win. Approximately ten minutes into the game Sattler collapsed after being punched by Manly forward John Bucknall. He suffered a double fracture to his jaw but pleaded to team mate Mike Cleary, "Hold me up so they don't know I'm hurt". He was helped up and continued to play in the game. At half time Souths were leading 12–6 when his team mates learnt about his injury.

During the interval he refused treatment and insisted he continue playing. He also told the side, "the next bloke who tries to cut me out of the play is in trouble," to prevent his team mates trying to protect him from further injury. At the end of the game South Sydney had scored 3 tries to nil in a 23–12 victory. He later went to hospital to receive treatment but only after receiving the Giltinan Shield and making an acceptance speech.

John Bucknall did not finish the game.

Representative career
Being injured during the 1970 Grand Final, he was not selected as captain for the Australian touring side announced later that night for the World Cup in England. However he had previously been selected in Australia's tour of Britain and France in 1967 and in the Australian teams which toured New Zealand in 1969 and 1971, in which he was selected as captain. He only managed to play in four tests for Australia, captaining his nation in three out of those four games.

He captained the Queensland state side against New South Wales in 1973 before retiring from professional rugby league the following year.

Sattler was sent off fifteen times during his career and served a total of 30 weeks of suspensions. But he is remembered for his physical and mental toughness rather than his poor disciplinary record.

Post playing
In the mid-1980s John Sattler was involved in one of the unsuccessful bids to form a Brisbane-based team for the New South Wales Rugby League premiership.

In February 2008, Sattler was named in the list of Australia's 100 Greatest Players (1908–2007) which was commissioned by the  NRL and  ARL to celebrate the code's centenary year in Australia.

In 2010 he was named as captain of Kurri Rugby League Club's team of the century.

Legacy
Australian country artist Perry Keyes released a song "The Day John Sattler Broke his Jaw" in 2007. Music reviewer Lauren Katulka said the song deserved to be an Australian classic: "It was so good that I wondered why we don’t all know it, the way we know “Khe Sanh” and “The Horses”. Indie band The Whitlams in its iteration with the Black Stump Band covered it in 2022. Frontman Tim Freedman described it as "the greatest song ever written about rugby league". The video clip features footage of the 1970 grand final.

Footnotes

External links
John Sattler at eraofthebiff.com
Queensland representatives at qrl.com.au

1942 births
2023 deaths
People from the Hunter Region
Australian rugby league players
South Sydney Rabbitohs players
Kurri Kurri Bulldogs players
Australia national rugby league team players
Wests Panthers players
Australia national rugby league team captains
Queensland rugby league team players
New South Wales rugby league team players
South Sydney Rabbitohs captains
Newcastle rugby league team players
Rugby league props
Rugby league players from Kurri Kurri